Quinn Allman (born January 18, 1982) is an American musician and producer, best known as the founding member, guitarist and backing vocalist in the rock band the Used.

Biography

Allman grew up in Springville, Utah, and later moved to Pleasant Grove, Utah.  As a teenager he used to collect stolen bikes in a barn.  He grew up watching his father play in numerous bands as a drummer, originally picking up the drums at age 5.

Allman picked up the guitar at age 14, and started playing in bands at 15. Allman is influenced by bands such as Face to Face, Goldfinger, Thursday, Kenna, Weezer, Jimmy Eat World and The New Transit Direction.

In 2001, Quinn Allman along with Branden Steineckert and Jeph Howard founded The Used. Later Quinn asked Bert McCracken if he was interested in joining the band.
The Used's singer, Bert McCracken, describes Quinn Allman as a "truly spiritual and warm" individual.

On February 2, 2015 The Used announced that Quinn would be taking a year long hiatus from the band. Justin Shekoski of Saosin temporarily replaced Quinn on subsequent tours. However, on November 19, 2015, The Used released a statement saying that they were moving forward without Allman as a "result of a mutual understanding". However, former bandmate Branden Steineckert, who had left the band nine years prior, hosted Allman on the final episode of his podcast 801PUNX. In the podcast, Allman claims he was actually not allowed to return to the band and was kicked out. He continues to write, record and produce music, as well as manage up and coming artists. Allman performed on Andy Black's debut solo album The Shadow Side, released in May 2016.

Discography

References

External links

 
 The Used official website

1982 births
Living people
Alternative rock guitarists
American alternative rock musicians
Latter Day Saints from Utah
American rock guitarists
American male guitarists
Lead guitarists
Guitarists from Utah
People from Orem, Utah
The Used members
21st-century American guitarists
21st-century American male musicians